Frederick Charles Raymer  (November 12, 1875 – June 11, 1957) was an infielder in Major League Baseball.

Sources

1875 births
1957 deaths
Baseball players from Kansas
Sportspeople from Leavenworth, Kansas
Major League Baseball infielders
Chicago Orphans players
Boston Beaneaters players
Minor league baseball managers
Austin Senators players
Dallas Steers players
Atchison Huskers players
Dallas Colts players
Kansas City Blues (baseball) players
Milwaukee Brewers (minor league) players
Great Falls Indians players
Pueblo Indians players
Sioux City Cornhuskers players
Columbus Senators players
Tacoma Tigers players
Johnstown Johnnies players
Sacramento Senators players
Sacramento Sacts players
Victoria Bees players